The 1971–72 Athenian League season was the 49th in the history of Athenian League. The league consisted of 48 teams.

Premier Division

The division featured three new teams, promoted from last season's Division One:
 Aveley  (1st)
 Erith & Belvedere (2nd)
 Hornchurch (3rd)

League table

Division One

The division featured three new teams, promoted from last season's Division Two: 
 Herne Bay (1st)
 Croydon Amateurs (2nd)
 Marlow (3rd)

League table

Division Two

The division joined 3 new teams, all from Spartan League:
 Staines Town
 Hampton
 Addlestone

League table

References

1971–72 in English football leagues
Athenian League